The Rochester Roosters were a Minnesota–Wisconsin League minor league baseball team that played during the 1910 season. They were the first professional team to be based in Rochester, Minnesota. They were managed by Frank O'Leary and were led by William Dunn offensively and Bernard McNeil on the mound.

References

Baseball teams established in 1910
Defunct minor league baseball teams
Professional baseball teams in Minnesota
Defunct baseball teams in Minnesota
Baseball teams disestablished in 1910
1910 establishments in Minnesota
1910 disestablishments in Minnesota
Minnesota-Wisconsin League teams